Marcello Maria Frigério (born 30 January 1971), also known as Tchelo, is an Italian-born Brazilian football manager and former player. He currently coaches the Paraguay women's national team.

Career
Frigério began his career as a footballer, playing in the youth team of Palmeiras. He later became a manager, coaching both men and women's football and futsal teams in Brazil and Italy. He also coached the Brazil women's Universiade team at the 2001 Summer Universiade, winning the gold medal. Frigério was the head coach of the Equatorial Guinea women's national team at the 2011 FIFA Women's World Cup. During the 2018 Chinese Women's Super League season, he coached Changchun Volkswagen Excellence.

Personal life
Frigério was born in Milan, Italy, but grew up from a young age in São Paulo. He holds dual citizenship in Italy and Brazil. He also worked as a commentator for BandNews and BandSports during the 2004 Summer Olympics and 2007 Pan American Games.

References

External links
 
 
 Marcello Frigério at Soccerdonna.de 
 Marcello Frigerio Técnico de Futebol 

1971 births
Living people
Footballers from Milan
Footballers from São Paulo
Italian footballers
Brazilian footballers
Sociedade Esportiva Palmeiras players
Italian football managers
Brazilian football managers
Italian expatriate football managers
Brazilian expatriate football managers
Italian expatriates in Equatorial Guinea
Brazilian expatriate sportspeople in Equatorial Guinea
Expatriate football managers in Equatorial Guinea
Italian expatriate sportspeople in Paraguay
Brazilian expatriate sportspeople in Paraguay
Expatriate football managers in Paraguay
Women's association football managers
Futsal coaches
Equatorial Guinea women's national football team managers
2011 FIFA Women's World Cup managers
Clube Atlético Sorocaba managers
Sociedade Esportiva Palmeiras (women) managers
Paraguay women's national football team managers
Association football commentators
Association footballers not categorized by position